(6 December 1930 – 30 June 2020) was a Japanese mathematician working in number theory. His contributions include works on p-adic L functions and real-analytic automorphic forms.

His work on p-adic L-functions, later recognised as an aspect of Iwasawa theory, was done jointly with Leopoldt.

He extended the concept of metaplectic group, in a way significant for arithmetic applications. This opened a field for later research on associated Dirichlet series and automorphic forms, and was a major step in the solution of Kummer's conjecture.

Works
On automorphic functions and the reciprocity law in a number field. Kinokuniya, Tokyo 1969
Notes on analytic theory of numbers. University of Chicago Press, 1963
with Sigekatu Kuroda: . ("Number Theory. Foundations of Algebraic Number Theory"), Asakura Shoten, Tokyo 1963
Some arithmetical applications of an elliptic function, Journal für Reine und Angewandte Mathematik, Band 214/215, 1964/1965, 141-145

editor: Investigations in number theory. Academic Press, 1988

Notes

External links
 1. Topological Linear Groupの被覆群 (代数的整数論研究会報告集)---名古屋大学理学部　久保田 富雄　(KUBOTA,TOMIO) / Proceeding of the Conference on Algebraic Number Theory

20th-century Japanese mathematicians
21st-century Japanese mathematicians
1930 births
2020 deaths
Academic staff of Nagoya University